is a Japanese professional wrestler, currently working for All Japan Pro Wrestling (AJPW), where he is a one-time Triple Crown Heavyweight Champion and seven-time World Tag Team Champion. He is also part of the All Japan Board of Directors. He has worked in New Japan Pro-Wrestling (NJPW), Pro Wrestling Noah (Noah) and Pro Wrestling Zero1 (Zero1).

Professional wrestling career

All Japan Pro Wrestling (1992–2000)
After being trained by Animal Hamaguchi, Omori debuted in All Japan Pro Wrestling, initially languishing in the mid-card and only able to get some recognition in 1995, when he and Jun Akiyama captured the All Asia Tag Team Championship. In 1998, he and newcomer Yoshihiro Takayama formed the NO FEAR tag team. The team soon won both the All Asia Tag Team Championship and the World Tag Team Championship, becoming the first team to win both titles at the same time. When Mitsuharu Misawa formed Pro Wrestling Noah, they followed him and dyed their hair blond to match the change of environment.

Omori's first American venture was in the World Wrestling Federation, where he competed in the 1996 Royal Rumble. He was eliminated by the returning Jake Roberts.

Pro Wrestling Noah and other promotions (2000–2004)
For an undisclosed reason, Omori called for an early ending to his singles bout with Shinya Hashimoto in the middle of their singles match at Noah's Great Voyage 2000 event, which was the company's most important event up to that point. Because of this, Omori was immediately in Misawa's doghouse, and after the NO FEAR team broke up (so Takayama could pursue mixed martial arts matches) Omori was sent abroad to Harley Race's World League Wrestling promotion in the American Midwest, where he won the company's heavyweight title. During his excursion, Misawa continued to deny that Omori had been sent abroad by Noah, and Omori was not welcomed back to Noah when he returned from the excursion. As a result, Omori joined Fighting World of Japan Pro Wrestling, where he feuded with Riki Choshu, Genichiro Tenryu and Kensuke Sasaki.

Pro Wrestling Zero1-Max (2004–2008)
In 2004, he joined Pro Wrestling ZERO1-MAX, where he was one of the strong native competitors along with (fellow Hamaguchi Dojo classmate) Shinjiro Otani. He has feuded with old team mate Yoshihiro Takayama, resulting in many bloody battles and disqualifications. On March 8, 2007, he and Manabu Nakanishi lost the ZERO1-MAX Intercontinental Tag Team Championship to Yoshihiro Takayama and Kohei Sato. On March 31, 2007, he defeated Steve Corino for the AWA Superstars of Wrestling World Heavyweight Championship, becoming a three-time champion. Nearly seven months to the day Omori won the AWA World Heavyweight championship, he would lose the title to Masato Tanaka. On August 16, 2008 Omori announced that he was leaving ZERO1-MAX and taking a break from pro wrestling.

New Japan Pro-Wrestling (2009–2010)
This break would not last long, as Omori appeared at a New Japan Pro-Wrestling show on March 15, 2009 to revive his team with Manabu Nakanishi. He also participated in the 2009 G1 Climax, pulling off two impressive victories in his first two matches by defeating both IWGP Heavyweight Champion Hiroshi Tanahashi and eventual tournament winner Togi Makabe. In January 2010 Omori announced his semi-retirement.

Freelancing (2010–2011)
Since semi-retiring, Omori had been wrestling select shows in various promotions, both mainstream and independent. In 2011, he has been wrestling semi-regularly with All Japan Pro Wrestling. Following the 2011 World's Strongest Tag Determination League, Omori appealed to Keiji Mutoh to officially join All Japan and Mutoh granted the request, officially rejoining All Japan.

Return to AJPW (2011–present)

Omori's first match back as an official member of the AJPW roster took place on December 25, 2011, teaming up with Manabu Soya and Seiya Sanada in a loss to Akebono, Keiji Mutoh, and Super Delfin. On March 20, 2012, Omori and Soya defeated Dark Cuervo and Dark Ozz for the World Tag Team Championship. After losing the title to Joe Doering and Seiya Sanada on May 20, Omori and Soya, known collectively as "Get Wild", regained the title on June 17. They vacated the title on October 30, in time for the 2012 World's Strongest Tag Determination League. On November 30, Get Wild won the tournament to regain the title. On December 11, Soya unsuccessfully challenged Masakatsu Funaki for the Triple Crown Heavyweight Championship. As a result, Get Wild was forced to disband, despite still holding the World Tag Team Championship. Get Wild went on to lose the title to Burning (Go Shiozaki and Jun Akiyama) on March 17, 2013. Following Soya's resignation from AJPW, Omori revived his team with Akiyama, naming it "Wild Burning" in January 2014. On February 8, Wild Burning unsuccessfully challenged Evolution (Joe Doering and Suwama) for the World Tag Team Championship. On April 27, Omori won his first Champion Carnival, defeating Jun Akiyama in the finals. On June 15, Omori defeated Akiyama in a rematch to win the vacant Triple Crown Heavyweight Championship for the first time. On June 28, Omori became only the sixth "Quintuple Crown Champion" in All Japan history, when he and Akiyama defeated Joe Doering and Suwama to win the World Tag Team Championship. However, the next day, Omori lost the Triple Crown Heavyweight Championship to Suwama, ending his reign at just 14 days. After successfully defending the World Tag Team Championship against Akebono and Yutaka Yoshie on October 22, Omori and Akiyama vacated the title the following day in time for the 2014 World's Strongest Tag Determination League. They regained the title by winning the tournament on December 6, defeating Go Shiozaki and Kento Miyahara in the finals. Wild Burning's second reign ended on March 22, 2015, when they were defeated by Akebono and Yutaka Yoshie. On January 1, 2016, Omori was appointed to the All Japan Board of Directors. On December 18, the reunited Get Wild defeated Jake Lee and Kento Miyahara in the finals to win the 2016 World's Strongest Tag Determination League.

Championships and accomplishments
 All Japan Pro Wrestling
 AJPW TV Six-Man Tag Team Championship (1 time) – with Black Menso~re and Carbell Ito
 All Asia Tag Team Championship (3 times, current) – with Jun Akiyama (1), Yoshihiro Takayama (1) and Masao Inoue (1)
 Triple Crown Heavyweight Championship (1 time)
 World Tag Team Championship (7 times) – with Yoshihiro Takayama (1), Manabu Soya (3) and Jun Akiyama (3)
 F-1 Tag Team Championship (1 time) – with Kannazuki1
 Asunaro Tag Team Cup (1998) – with Jun Akiyama
 Champion Carnival (2014)
 January 2 Korakuen Hall Heavyweight Battle Royal (1997, 2014, 2017)
 World's Strongest Tag Determination League (2012, 2016) – with Manabu Soya
 World's Strongest Tag Determination League (2014) – with Jun Akiyama
 DDT Pro-Wrestling
 GAY World Anal Championship (1 time)
 European Wrestling Association
 EWA World Heavyweight Championship (1 time)
 New Japan Pro-Wrestling
 IWGP Tag Team Championship (1 time) – with Manabu Nakanishi
 Interim IWGP Tag Team Championship (1 time) – with Manabu Nakanishi
 Nikkan Sports
 Best Tag Team Award (2012) with Manabu Soya
 Pro Wrestling Illustrated
 Ranked No. 66 of the top 500 singles wrestlers in the PWI 500 in 2000
 Pro Wrestling Noah
 GHC Tag Team Championship (1 time) – with Yoshihiro Takayama
 Pro Wrestling Zero1-Max
 AWA World Heavyweight Championship (3 times)
 NWA Intercontinental Tag Team Championship (3 times)2 – with Shiro Koshinaka (1), Shinjiro Otani (1), and Manabu Nakanishi (1)
 NWA United National Heavyweight Championship (1 time)3
 Tokyo Sports
 Best Tag Team Award (2012) – with Manabu Soya
 World League Wrestling
 WLW Heavyweight Championship (1 time)

1Championship not officially recognized by All Japan Pro Wrestling.
2Although the title still uses the NWA initials, it is not recognized or sanctioned by the National Wrestling Alliance since the promotion withdrew from the NWA in 2004.
3This title shouldn't be confused with the NWA United National Championship, a defunct NWA singles championship that is currently one of the three championships used to comprise the Triple Crown Heavyweight Championship.

References

External links 
 

Living people
Japanese male professional wrestlers
1969 births
IWGP Heavyweight Tag Team Champions
GHC Tag Team Champions
All Asia Tag Team Champions
World Tag Team Champions (AJPW)
Triple Crown Heavyweight Champions
F-1 Tag Team Champions
20th-century professional wrestlers
21st-century professional wrestlers